The  Colorado Crush season was the eleventh season for the professional indoor football franchise and ninth in the Indoor Football League (IFL). It was the second season of the franchise being labeled the Crush after playing nine seasons under the Ice moniker. The Crush were one of ten teams that competed in the IFL for the 2017 season. The Crush were members of the Intense Conference.

Led by first-year head coach Jose Jefferson for the first ten weeks and then interim head coach Marvin Jones, the Crush played their home games at the Budweiser Events Center in Loveland, Colorado.

On October 19, 2016, it was announced that Project FANchise had purchased the Crush.

Roster changes

Free agents

Signings

Trades
 October 14: The Crush acquired defensive back Deante' Purvis in a trade that sent defensive back Rashard Smith to the Wichita Falls Nighthawks.
 February 13: The Crush acquired offensive lineman Sean Brown in a trade that sent future considerations to the Green Bay Blizzard.

Staff

Schedule
Key:

Regular season
All start times are local time

Standings

Roster

References

Colorado Crush
Colorado Crush (IFL)
Colorado Crush